Ophiogomphus acuminatus, the acuminate snaketail, is a species of dragonfly in the family Gomphidae. It is endemic to the United States, where it is known from Alabama and Tennessee.  Its natural habitat is rivers.

References

Insects of the United States
Ophiogomphus
Taxonomy articles created by Polbot
Insects described in 1981